Abdul Majeed Kakroo  is a retired Indian footballer from Kashmir who played as a striker and he represented India at the 1984 Asian Cup. He became the first player from Kashmir to captain India when he captained the team during the 1987 Nehru Cup. He played for both Mohun Bagan and East Bengal during his club career. One of the stands at the TRC Turf Ground has been named after him by Real Kashmir FC.

Club career
He signed his first professional contract in 1977 with Road Transport Cooperation (RTC). He was paid a salary of Rs.180 per month. He helped RTC reach the quarterfinals of the Durand Cup where they lost to JCT. He also represented Jammu and Kashmir in the Santosh Trophy tournament. He later went on to play for East Bengal and Mohun Bagan and became one of the highest paid footballers in the country. Kakroo had to cut short his football career in Kolkata after he received threats from militants to return home.

International career
After impressing in the Durand Cup in 1979-80, he was called up to the National Team camp. He wasn't selected for the final team and was told to improve his game with the left foot. He later went on to play for the national team for 8 years. He was a part of the Indian squad that played in the 1984 Asian Cup. Later, he captained the national team in the 1987 Nehru Cup. He scored goals against China and Malaysia in the 1983 President's Cup. He played a total of 30 matches with the National team.

Honours 

India
 South Asian Games Gold medal: 1987

References

External links
Stats

Living people
Indian footballers
India international footballers
1984 AFC Asian Cup players
Footballers from Jammu and Kashmir
Association football defenders
Year of birth missing (living people)
Mohun Bagan AC players
East Bengal Club players
Calcutta Football League players
South Asian Games medalists in football
South Asian Games gold medalists for India